Steiri is a village in Boeotia, Greece. It is situated at the western end of Mount Helicon, the mythical mountain of the Muses, at 450 m elevation. In 2011 its population was 686. The 10th century Hosios Loukas monastery, a World Heritage Site, is situated near Steiri. Steiri is 4 km southeast of Distomo and 15 km west of Livadeia. The Greek National Road 29 (Itea - Desfina - Distomo - Hosios Loukas) passes through the village.

Population

References

External links

 Steiri at the Municipality of Distomo's website
 Steiri on the GTP Travel Pages

Populated places in Boeotia